Prit Buttar is a British general practitioner and writer. He has written twelve history books on the eastern fronts of World War I and World War II, and two novels. Dr. Buttar was Senior Partner at Abingdon Surgery until he moved to Scotland in late 2017.

Career
Buttar studied medicine at Oxford University and London University, and served in the British Army as a surgeon and medical officer for five years. He later worked in Bristol as a general practitioner (GP). Buttar worked as a GP in Abingdon-on-Thames from 2000 to 2017 and served on the GP's Committee of the British Medical Association. He is Chairman of the Oxfordshire Local Medical Committee.

Buttar's first book, Battleground Prussia, was inspired by one of his patients. The 83-year-old patient recalled stories about her life as a nurse in East Prussia and escape from the Red Army near the end of World War II. Buttar spent 8 years writing the book. His second book, Between Giants, is a study of the battles for the Baltics in WWII, and explores the experiences of people from Lithuania, Latvia, and Estonia.

His third book, Collision of Empires, is a study of the Eastern Front of World War I. It is the first of a four volume series. Before writing the book, Buttar spent a year studying archives in Berlin, Vienna, and Freiberg. With the help of another historian, the multi-lingual Buttar was able to translate the German archives. The second book of the series, Germany Ascendant: The Eastern Front 1915, was released in 2015.

In 2023, Buttar appeared on the history-centered podcast, Out of the Box with Jonathan Russo.

Personal life
Buttar is married to Debbie, an army nurse. They have two children. Their daughter studied History at Cambridge University.

Published works
There Stood A Soldier: A Novel of Stalingrad. 2005. Lulu Press. 
Battleground Prussia: The Assault on Germany's Eastern Front 1944–45. 2010. Osprey Publishing. 
Between Giants: The Battle for the Baltics in World War II. 2013. Osprey Publishing. 
Collision of Empires: The War on the Eastern Front in 1914. 2014. Osprey Publishing. 
Germany Ascendant: The Eastern Front 1915. 2015. Osprey Publishing. 
Russia's Last Gasp: The Eastern Front 1916-17. 2016. Osprey Publishing. 
The Splintered Empires: The Eastern Front 1917–21. 2017. Osprey Publishing. 
Old Friends: A story of love. 2017. Amazon Publishing. 
On a Knife's Edge: The Ukraine, November 1942–March 1943. 2018. Osprey Publishing. 
Retribution: The Soviet Reconquest of Central Ukraine, 1943. 2019. Osprey Publishing. 
The Reckoning: The Defeat of Army Group South, 1944. 2020. Osprey Publishing. 
Meat Grinder: The Battles for the Rzhev Salient, 1942–43. 2022. Osprey Publishing. 
Centuries Will Not Suffice: A History of the Lithuanian Holocaust. 2023. Amberley Publishing. 
To Besiege a City: Leningrad 1941–42. 2023. Osprey Publishing.

References

20th-century British medical doctors
21st-century British medical doctors
Alumni of the University of London
Alumni of the University of Oxford
British historians
British military historians
Historians of World War I
Historians of World War II
Living people
Year of birth missing (living people)